The 2005 Pan American Women's Handball Championship was the eighth edition of the Pan American Women's Handball Championship, held in Brazil. It acted as the American qualifying tournament for the 2005 World Women's Handball Championship.

Standings

Results
All times are local (UTC−3).

Final ranking

External links
Results on todor66.com

2005 Women
American Women's Handball Championship
Pan
2005 in Brazilian women's sport
May 2005 sports events in South America